Ravni Šort is a village in the municipality of Kuršumlija, Serbia. According to the 2002 census, the village had a population of 51.

References

Populated places in Toplica District